Hristo Yanev (born 4 May 1979 in Kazanlak) is a Bulgarian football manager and former player. Yanev played as a midfielder.

Career

Early years
Born in Kazanluk, Yanev was picked as a youth to play for local side Rozova Dolina, making his professional debut for Olimpik Teteven during the 1997–98 season. In 1999, he joined Beroe Stara Zagora, scoring 7 goals in 27 matches.

CSKA Sofia
After playing one season at Beroe, Yanev signed for CSKA Sofia in 2000, when he was only 20 years old and since then he has always played an important role in the team. Yanev plays either as a winger or second striker.

He made his competitive debut for CSKA on 4 August 2000 in a 0–0 home draw against Litex Lovech. On 25 August, Yanev scored his CSKA's first and first-ever UEFA Cup goal in an 8–0 drubbing of Moldovan Constructorul. Two days later, he scored his first league goal for CSKA in a 3–0 home win over Botev Plovdiv.

As a player of CSKA Yanev has been twice champion of Bulgaria (in 2003 and 2005) and has once won the Bulgarian national cup 2006. He spent six seasons of his career at the club, playing in 146 games of the A PFG and scoring 54 goals.

Grenoble
In summer of 2006, Grenoble Foot 38 signed Yanev to a three-year deal. For three years he made 50 appearances in league and scored six goals for Grenoble. With the club he played two seasons in Ligue 2 and one in Ligue 1.

Litex Lovech
On 25 June 2009, Yanev returned to Bulgaria, signing a three-year contract with Litex Lovech. He established himself as a key figure for the team from Lovech, helping them win the 2010 and 2011 A PFG titles. He left the club after the end of the 2011/2012 season.

Return to CSKA Sofia
On 7 June 2012, Yanev signed a contract with former club CSKA Sofia. Yanev's second stay at CSKA turned out to be short-lived, as he was released from the club in the summer of 2012 following the team's elimination from the UEFA Europa League by Slovenian club Mura 05.

Panetolikos
On 12 September 2012, Yanev signed with Greek club Panetolikos F.C. On 8 April 2013, he was released from the team.

Slavia Sofia
In the summer of 2013, he joined Slavia Sofia after having trained with the team for a number of weeks.

International career
 
Yanev received his first call-up to the senior team in Hristo Stoichkov's first game in charge of Bulgaria in 2004. On 18 August he made his debut, replacing Marian Hristov as a second-half substitute in a 1–1 friendly draw against Ireland at Lansdowne Road Stadium. Two weeks later, on 4 September, Yanev scored his first international goal in a 3–1 win over Iceland in a 2006 World Cup qualifier. On 13 October, he scored the second goal in Bulgaria's 4–1 win over Malta in Sofia.

Two years later, on 9 May 2006, Yanev netted his third goal for the senior team as he scored the winning strike in a 2–1 victory over Japan in a game of the Kirin Cup.

Coaching career
During the winter break of the 2014–15 season, Yanev was appointed head coach of Minyor Pernik, whom at that time were participating in the South-West V Group. He officially debuted his coaching career on 1 March 2015 at Minyor's thrashing 4–1 over Germanea Sapareva Banya.

In the summer of 2015, he was approached by the financially troubled CSKA Sofia, who were sent off to the V Group after the club's failure to obtain a license for the upcoming season in the first division.

On 17 September 2016, Yanev was appointed as manager of Neftochimic Burgas. He couldn't save the team from relegation and left the team in June 2017 after the final relegation play-off against Vitosha Bistritsa. Neftochimic's sporting director questioned his integrity and lack of responsibility.

Career statistics

Manager statistics

Honours

Player
Litex Lovech
Bulgarian A PFG: 2009–10, 2010–11
Bulgarian Supercup: 2010
CSKA Sofia
Bulgarian A PFG: 2002–03, 2004–05
Bulgarian Cup: 2005–06

Manager
CSKA Sofia
 Bulgarian Cup: 2015–16
 V AFG: 2015–16

References

External links

1979 births
Living people
Bulgarian football managers
Bulgarian footballers
Bulgarian expatriate footballers
Bulgaria international footballers
PFC Beroe Stara Zagora players
PFC CSKA Sofia players
Grenoble Foot 38 players
PFC Litex Lovech players
Panetolikos F.C. players
PFC Slavia Sofia players
First Professional Football League (Bulgaria) players
Ligue 1 players
Expatriate footballers in France
Bulgarian expatriate sportspeople in France
Expatriate footballers in Greece
Bulgarian expatriate sportspeople in Greece
Association football midfielders
People from Kazanlak